is a  Japanese martial arts directed by Kazuhiko Yamaguchi and starred by Etsuko Shihomi. The film is a sequel to Sister Street Fighter. It was followed by a third and final film titled The Return of the Sister Street Fighter (1975).

Cast
 Etsuko Shihomi - Lǐ Hónglóng (Li Kōryū)
 Yasuaki Kurata - Shunsuke Tsubaki
 Tamayo Mitsukawa - Li Bailan (Li Hakuran)
 Michiyo Bandō - Kotoe Fujita
 Hisayo Tanaka - Wang Meili (Ō Birei)
 Hideo Murota - Kazushige Osone
 Kōji Fujiyama - Goro Kuroki
 Kōji Hio - Kiyoshi Nezu
 Masashi Ishibashi - Inoichiro Honiden
 Kazuyuki Saito - Shikajiro Honiden
 Daikyo Rin - Chozaburo Honiden
 Riki Harada - Cui Chiniu
 Kanya Tsukasa - Byakko
 Osamu Kaneda - Konosuke Mayuzumi
 Rikiya Yasuoka - Genjuro Ranai

Reception
Jim McLennan from the website "Girls with Guns" gave the film two and a half stars out of four, criticizing its lack of originality: "...if you watch this back to back with the original, it's almost going to seem like a mockbuster rather than a sequel, albeit made by much the same people. One semi-significant difference is that replacing Sonny Chiba, you have Kurata, playing a martial-arts master who joins the Osone gang with his own agenda. The opponents for our heroine are still the same selection of fighters with different talents, each introduced with a caption describing their origin. But these seem significantly more restrained than first time round, outside of the transsexual killer with her lethal fingernails". Don Anelli, writing for the "Asian Movie Pulse", opined: "While on the surface providing pretty much exactly what's needed in terms of fine martial arts battles and a simplistic story to set that up, Sister Street Fighter 2 comes off as a lower version of the original in most regards. As it's still worthwhile and watchable, give this a chance if you're a fan of the first one or a general film of these kinds of films from that era, while viewers who aren't into martial arts efforts or weren't fans of the original should heed caution".

References

External links 
 

1974 films
1974 martial arts films
Japanese sequel films
Films directed by Kazuhiko Yamaguchi
1970s Japanese-language films
Karate films
Toei Company films
Films scored by Shunsuke Kikuchi
The Street Fighter
1970s Japanese films